Khon Kham was the sixth king of Lan Xang, and reigned for one year and six months. He was the son of King Samsenthai and Queen Noi On Sor of the Kingdom of Lan Na. He was appointed as Governor of Muang Xieng Sa and was granted a ministerial title, when he came of age. He was succeeded by his brother Kham Tam Sa. He was killed at Kokrua, on the orders of Nang Keo Phimpha.

References

See also
 History of Laos

Kings of Lan Xang
Year of birth unknown
1432 deaths
15th-century Laotian people
15th-century monarchs in Asia
Laotian Theravada Buddhists